was a chain of hotels in Manchuria owned and operated by the South Manchuria Railway during the period from the 1910s to 1940s. Some of these hotels still exist in Northeast China, under different names.

Background
During the time of the South Manchuria Railway Company's operations within various cities in Manchuria between 1907 and 1945, the South Manchuria Railway Company was involved in the management of a series of high-grade chain hotels. The South Manchuria Railway Company's department of transportation was responsible for high-class hotels within its jurisdiction, which were intended as a place for men to stay during times of military activity. A number of Yamato hotels were built, including the following:
 Dairen: Opened on August 1, 1914, used now as the Dalian Hotel. Bo Xilai's favorite hotel while in Dalian.
 Hoshigaura (Star Beach): Beach resort in suburban Dairen.
 Ryojun (Port Arthur): Opened March 21, 1908 by the Russians, when the city was known as Port Arthur. Today used by the People's Liberation Army, not open to foreigners.
 Mukden: Opened in 1910, current building constructed in 1929, used now as the Liaoning Hotel. Mao Zedong, Deng Xiaoping and other political dignitaries used to stay there.
 Hsinking (Changchun): Built in 1910, used now as the old building of the Chunyi Hotel.
 Harbin: Originally built by the Russians in 1905, re-built by the Japanese in 1935, used now as the Longmen Dasha VIP Hotel.

See also
 Manchukuo
 South Manchuria Railway

Gallery

References

External links

Liaoning Hotel, Shenyang (formerly Yamato Hotel, Mukden) - official website

Railway hotels
Hotels in China
Hotels in Dalian
History of Manchuria
Defunct companies of Japan
Buildings and structures in Dalian
Buildings and structures in Shenyang
Buildings and structures in Changchun
Buildings and structures in Harbin
Buildings in Manchukuo
Companies in Manchukuo